Karel Lambert (born 1928) is an American philosopher and logician at the University of California, Irvine and the University of Salzburg. He has written extensively on the subject of free logic, a term which he coined.

Lambert's law
Lambert's law is the major principle in any free definite description theory that says: For all x, x = the y (A) if and only if (A(x/y) & for all y (if A then y = x)).

Free logic itself is an adjustment of a given standard predicate logic such as to relieve it of existential assumptions, and so make it a free logic. Taking Bertrand Russell's predicate logic in his Principia Mathematica as standard, one replaces universal instantiation, with universal specification . Thus universal statements, like "All men are mortal," or "Everything is a unicorn," do not presuppose that there are men or that there is anything. The truth of these last statements, when used in a free logic, depend on the domain of quantification, which may be the null set.

Published works
 "Free Logic and the Concept of Existence", Notre Dame Journal of Formal Logic, VIII, numbers 1 and 2, April 1967.
 Philosophical Applications of Free Logic, New York: Oxford University Press, 1991, "A Theory of Definite Descriptions", pp. 17–27, details an account of Russell's Theory of Descriptions in free logic. In the process, he demonstrates how a formulation from Hintikka allows for a contradiction by a correlate in logic to Russell's paradox. He introduces the predicate .
 Free Logic. Selected Essays, Cambridge University Press, 2003.

References

External links
 Official personal page at Internet Archive

1928 births
American logicians
21st-century American philosophers
Academic staff of the University of Salzburg
University of California, Irvine faculty
Living people